The Glycine receptor subunit alpha-3 is a protein that in humans is encoded by the GLRA3 gene.  The protein encoded by this gene is a subunit of the glycine receptor.

References

Further reading

External links 
 
 PDBe-KB provides an overview of all the structure information available in the PDB for Human Glycine receptor subunit alpha-3 (GLRA3)

Ion channels